nèi is the Chinese for "inner, interior". Depending on context, it may refer to:
the interior of China, see Mainland China
"internal" martial arts, see Neijia
"internal" alchemy, see Neidan
a type of rime in Chinese poetry, see Rime table

See also
Radical 11